Living Very Happily is Cantopop artist Miriam Yeung's fourteenth Cantonese studio album. It was released by Amusic on 16 October 2009.

The album includes eleven new songs. The second edition of the album came out on 2 December 2009.  The second album includes a DVD with three music videos.

Track listing
 真命天子 (The Man of Destiny)
  我在橋上看風景 (Standing on a Bridge Looking at the Scenery)
  原來過得很快樂 (Living Very Happily)
  你幸福嗎 (Are You Happy?)
  All About Love
  麥芽糖 (Maltose)
  藍風箏 (Blue Kite)
  對木偶唱歌 (Singing to the Puppet)
  孖公仔 (Twins)
  圓缺 (Complete and Incomplete)
  All About Love (Little Orchestra Mix)

DVD
 真命天子 (The Man of Destiny) MV
  我在橋上看風景 (Standing on a Bridge Looking at the Scenery) MV
  原來過得很快樂 (Living Very Happily) MV

Awards and Recognitions

References

2009 albums
Miriam Yeung albums